The Gymnastics competitions in the 1977 Summer Universiade were held in Sofia, Bulgaria.

Men's events

Women's events

Exterbal links
 Universiade gymnastics medalists on HickokSports (Men's team results are wrong)
  Men's team results from New York Times
 Men Individual results 
 Women Individual results 
 Men's Team event results

References

1977 in gymnastics
1977 Summer Universiade
Gymnastics at the Summer Universiade